Fernando Enrique Alvarez (born 1964) is an Argentine macroeconomist. He is professor of economics at the University of Chicago. He received his B.A. in Economics at Universidad Nacional de La Plata in 1989 and his Ph.D. from the University of Minnesota in 1994. He was elected a Fellow of the Econometric Society in 2008. He was named a Fellow of the American Academy of Arts and Sciences in 2018.

Fernando Alvarez's most influential contribution seems to be his work with Urban Jermann (Wharton) on endogenously incomplete markets. They show how the limited commitment model of Timothy Kehoe and David Levine and also of Narayana Kocherlakota can be decentralized with certain borrowing constraints. They also showed how this model could explain some feature of asset prices, such as the equity premium. Several papers have used their model later on to explain other macroeconomic phenomena.

Fernando Alvarez has also presented a new estimate of the welfare cost of business cycles, which is based on observed asset prices (with Urban Jermann). His other work includes models of monetary economies with segmented markets and search models with incomplete markets.

Published works

References

External links
Profile page on University of Chicago

20th-century Argentine economists
Macroeconomists
University of Minnesota alumni
Fellows of the American Academy of Arts and Sciences
Fellows of the Econometric Society
University of Chicago faculty
National University of La Plata alumni
21st-century Argentine economists
Living people

1964 births
Journal of Political Economy editors